John Hampden (24 June 1643) was an English landowner and politician whose opposition to arbitrary taxes imposed by Charles I made him a national figure. An ally of Parliamentarian leader John Pym, and cousin to Oliver Cromwell, he was one of the Five Members whose attempted arrest in January 1642 sparked the First English Civil War.

After war began in August 1642, Hampden raised an infantry regiment, and died of wounds received at the Battle of Chalgrove Field on 18 June 1643. His loss was considered a serious blow, largely because he was one of the few Parliamentary leaders able to hold the different factions together.

However, his early death also meant he avoided the bitter internal debates later in the war, the execution of Charles I in 1649, and establishment of The Protectorate. This makes him a less complex figure than Cromwell or Pym, a key factor in why his statue was erected in the Palace of Westminster to represent the Parliamentarian cause in 1841.

A reputation for honest, principled, and patriotic opposition to arbitrary rule also made him a popular figure in North America; prior to the American Revolution, Benjamin Franklin and John Adams were among those who referenced him to justify their cause.

Personal details
John Hampden was born around June 1595, probably in London, eldest son of William Hampden (1570–1597), and Elizabeth Cromwell (1574–1664). The family wre long-established in Buckinghamshire, and William was Member of Parliament for East Looe in 1593. After his father died in April 1597, his cousin, another William Hampden, was appointed executor but became involved in a bitter legal dispute with Elizabeth; John's younger brother, Richard (1596–1659), inherited his estates at Emmington.

Hampden married Elizabeth Symeon in 1619, and they had nine children prior to her death in 1631, of whom seven survived into adulthood. Ann (1616–1701), Elizabeth (1619–1643), John (1621–1642), William (died 1675), Ruth (1628–1687), Mary (1630–1689), and Richard (1631–1695), Chancellor of the Exchequer under William III. In 1640, he married Letitia Knollys (1591–1666); they had no children before he died in 1643.

Career

1610 to 1629; Political activism
Hampden graduated from Magdalen College, Oxford in 1610, and attended the Inner Temple from 1613 to 1615, not necessarily to become a lawyer, but because knowledge of the law was then considered part of a gentleman's education. While studying in London, he became involved with other Puritans, a general term for anyone who wanted to 'purify' the Church of England by removing what they considered to be Catholic practises. Members belonged to a variety of Protestant sects, the most prominent being Presbyterians like Hampden, connecting him to a network that included  Richard Knightley, Lord Saye, and John Preston.

In 1621, he became MP for Grampound, a rotten borough in Cornwall controlled by the local magnate, John Arundell; a good example of the complexity of the period, Arundell opposed Ship Money in the 1630s, but during the First English Civil War held Pendennis Castle for Charles I. Hampden subsequently financed a successful campaign to restore Parliamentary representation to Wendover in 1624, a seat he held until 1629. As MP for Wendover in 1626, he sat in the so-called "Useless Parliament", known as such for failing to pass any legislation. In return for approving taxes, Parliament demanded the impeachment of the Duke of Buckingham, a close friend of the king, and a military commander notorious for inefficiency and extravagance.

Rather than comply, Charles dissolved it and resorted to raising money through forced loans, with over 70 individuals jailed for refusing to pay, including Hampden's uncle, Sir Edmund Hampden. When Hampden also declined to subscribe, he was arrested, and while in prison met Sir John Eliot, a leading member of the Parliamentary opposition. When the "loans" failed to produce sufficient income, Charles was forced to call new elections in March 1627, which returned "a preponderance of MPs opposed to the King", including Hampden, Selden, Coke, John Pym and a young Oliver Cromwell.

Released to attend the new Parliament, Hampden collaborated with Eliot and others in efforts to limit Royal power. The most significant was the June 1628 Petition of Right, which opened the way to a new impeachment of Buckingham, a campaign that ended after he was assassinated in August 1628 by a disgruntled soldier. The next issue was that of Roger Maynwaring and Robert Sibthorpe, two priests who published sermons supportive of the divine right of kings, passive obedience, and which implied Charles was entitled to raise taxes as he wished. 

In the 17th century, many believed 'good government' and 'true religion' were closely linked, and alterations in one implied alterations in the other. Using divine right to justify the levying of taxes without the approval of Parliament was inflammatory enough in itself, but Maynwaring also claimed those who disobeyed the king risked eternal damnation, infuriating Puritans who generally believed in Predestination, and salvation through faith. His suggestion 'kings were gods' was also regarded as blasphemy. Censured for preaching against the established constitution, the two men were later pardoned by Charles, who dismissed Parliament in 1629, and instituted eleven years of Personal Rule.

1630 to 1639; Ship Money

Hampden's role in the 1628 Parliament was largely behind the scenes, where his organisational and man-management skills could be best used, but placed him in the inner circle of Parliamentary opposition. In 1629, the Earl of Warwick granted him lands in Saybrook Colony, now Old Saybrook, Connecticut; participation in the colonial movement was common among Puritan leaders. Other participants included Pym, who was treasurer of the Providence Island Company, Warwick, Lord Saye, Knightley, Henry Darley, William Waller, and Lord Brooke. Company meetings provided cover to organise political opposition; whether its members also considered permanent emigration is still disputed.

Hampden remained a relatively obscure figure, until 1637, when he was prosecuted in a test case to confirm the legality of Ship Money. This was a long-standing levy, raised in coastal counties to fund the Royal Navy, but only in time of war, not every year as Charles was now doing. Opposition was based on the principle of taxes imposed without Parliamentary approval, not the tax itself; there was widespread support for a powerful navy to protect English trade.

Its extension into inland counties like Hampden's estates in Buckinghamshire widened opposition to its collection, and how it was spent. , a 100 gun warship built between 1634 and 1637, was a prestige project five times the cost of normal ships, too large for any English harbour. Finally, rather than using it to deter Charles used it to transport Spanish bullion and supplies to Flanders for their war against the Protestant Dutch, payment for which he kept.

The Parliamentary leaders, including Hampden, owned multiple properties, and to make it clear they only opposed its legality, they were careful to pay some assessments. Hampden was tried by the Court of Exchequer in June 1637, but divisions among the judges delayed their ruling until July 1638. Although seven out of the twelve found the tax legal, the fact five did not made it a public relations disaster for Charles; less than 20% of the £208,000 assessed for 1639 was paid. Many refused demands for 'Coat and conduct' money during the 1639 and 1640 Bishops' Wars, fearing if they did, Charles would turn them into permanent taxes.

1640 to July 1642; the road to civil war
Following defeat in the first of the Bishops Wars, Charles recalled Parliament in April 1640; when the Short Parliament refused to vote taxes without concessions, he dissolved it after only three weeks. However, the humiliating terms imposed by the Scots after a second victory in 1640 forced him to hold fresh elections in November; Pym acted as unofficial leader of the opposition, with Hampden co-ordinating the different factions. Shortly after the Long Parliament assembled, it was presented with the Root and Branch petition; signed by 15,000 Londoners, it demanded England follow the Scottish example and expel bishops from the Church of England.
 

This reflected widespread concern over Arminianism in the Church of England, seen as evidence of pro-Catholic policies and confirmed by Charles making war on the Protestant Scots, but not assisting his nephew Charles Louis against the Catholic Emperor. Many feared he was about to sign an alliance with Spain, a view shared by the French and Venetian ambassadors; ending arbitrary rule was thus important for England and the European Protestant cause in general.  

Since convention prevented direct attacks on Charles, the alternative was to prosecute his 'evil counsellors', showing even if he was above the law, his subordinates were not, and he could not protect them; the intention was to make others think twice about their actions. Laud was impeached in December 1640, and held in the Tower of London; the king's chief minister the Earl of Strafford, former Lord Deputy of Ireland and organiser of the 1640 Bishops War, was executed in May 1641.

The Commons also passed a series of constitutional reforms, including the Triennial Acts, abolition of the Star Chamber, and an end to levying taxes without Parliament's consent. Voting as a block, the bishops ensured all these were rejected by the Lords. In June 1641, Parliament responded with the Bishops Exclusion Bill, which was rejected by the Lords. The outbreak of the Irish Rebellion in October brought matters to a head; both Charles and Parliament supported raising troops to suppress it, but neither trusted the other with their control. 

The Grand Remonstrance was presented to Charles on 1 December 1641; unrest culminated in 23 to 29 December with widespread riots in Westminster, led by the London apprentices. Suggestions Parliamentary leaders helped organise these have not been proved, but it prevented bishops attending the Lords. On 30 December, John Williams, Archbishop of York and eleven other bishops, signed a complaint, disputing the legality of any laws passed by the Lords during their exclusion. Led by Denzil Holles, the Commons ruled this was an invitation for the king to dissolve Parliament, and all twelve were arrested for treason.

On 4 January, Charles tried to arrest the Five Members, including Hampden, Pym and Holles; after it failed, he left London, accompanied by Royalist MPs like Edward Hyde, and members of the Lords. This was a major tactical mistake, as it gave his opponents majorities in both houses. However, even at this late stage, the vast majority on both sides wanted to avoid civil war, and petitioned Parliament and Charles to agree terms.

Pym and Hampden were among the few to understand only military victory could compel Charles to keep his commitments. He openly told foreign ambassadors any concessions were temporary, and would be retrieved by force if needed, an approach confirmed by the Scottish experience. The Irish Catholic rebels claimed approval for their actions; while untrue, the assertion was given weight by his attempts to use Irish troops against the Scots, and initial refusal to condemn the rebellion.

However, regardless of religion or political belief, in 1642 the vast majority believed a 'well-ordered' monarchy was divinely mandated; where they disagreed was what 'well-ordered' meant, and who held ultimate authority in clerical affairs. Since Charles could not be deposed, the only way of dealing with him was through military victory; it was this clarity that set Hampden, Pym, and later Oliver Cromwell apart from the majority. When the First English Civil War began, Hampden was appointed to the Committee of Safety.

August 1642 to June 1643; War and death

When war began in August 1642, both sides expected it to be settled by a single, decisive battle; many areas remained neutral, while awaiting the result. Hampden raised a regiment, which acted as artillery escort at the Battle of Edgehill in October and helped repulse the Royalist cavalry. After the disastrous Battle of Brentford, he helped rally troops for the defence of London. However, his main contribution was holding the Parliamentary factions together over the first winter, and preparing for a long war by initiating the negotiations that led to the Solemn League and Covenant with the Scots in August 1643.

When the 1643 campaign began, Hampden was serving with the Earl of Essex, whose lack of aggression was already causing concern. Tasked with taking the Royalist war capital of Oxford, Essex captured Reading on 27 April, where he remained until mid May. On 18 June 1643, Hampden was wounded at the Battle of Chalgrove Field; shot twice in the shoulder, the wound became infected. Later claims these injuries were caused by the explosion of his own pistol have not been substantiated.

He died at home six days later, and was buried in Great Hampden church. Unlike Pym, who died of cancer in December, his loss was mourned on both sides of the conflict; his close friend Anthony Nicholl wrote ‘Never Kingdom received a greater loss in one subject, never a man a truer and more faithful friend.’ In 1843, George Nugent-Grenville, a Whig radical politician and author of the hagiographic and often inaccurate Memorials of John Hampden, paid for the Hampden Monument, located near the battle site.

Legacy

Hampden is seen as a less complex figure than either Pym or his cousin Oliver Cromwell, while his death in 1643 meant he avoided the bitter internal debates later in the war, the execution of Charles in 1649, and establishment of The Protectorate. One of the best known examples of this appears in Thomas Gray's poem "Elegy Written in a Country Churchyard", which includes the lines "Some village-Hampden, that with dauntless breast / The little tyrant of his fields withstood...Some Cromwell guiltless of his country's blood." 

In reality, he and Pym both recognised far earlier than most Charles had to be defeated militarily, but Hampden rarely made speeches, and was far less visible. In his 'History of the Rebellion', Clarendon claimed his influence and reputation derived from his man management skills and organisational abilities. Prior to the 1774 American Revolution, Benjamin Franklin and John Adams used Hampden to claim rebellion against the state could be reconciled with patriotism, while his death in battle allowed him to be positioned as a martyr to the cause of liberty. 

The early 19th century British radical movement set up Hampden Clubs, and he was referenced by Radical poet Percy Shelley. In Mary Shelley's novel, Frankenstein, he appears as a symbol of rebellion against patriarchal authority. When the Palace of Westminster was rebuilt after 1834, he was selected as one of the famous Parliamentary figures whose statues are positioned in St Stephen's Hall. The early 20th century Suffragette movement used him to justify their slogan of 'No vote, no tax', as do modern anti-tax resisters, although this misses the point he objected to levying them without the approval of Parliament, not the taxes themselves.

A variety of establishments bear his name, in Britain, and other parts of the English-speaking world, notably the United States; these include Hampden-Sydney College, Virginia, founded in 1775, plus numerous schools, towns, counties, hospitals, and geographical points. His enduring popularity as a symbol of Parliamentary freedom continues; Mount Hampden was selected as the location for the new Parliament of Zimbabwe building, due for completion in 2022. One of the London Underground electric locomotives used on the Metropolitan line was named "John Hampden"; retired in 1961, it is now on display in the London Transport Museum. In addition, two Masonic lodges bear his name; Lodge 6290, in Oxfordshire, and 6483 in Buckinghamshire.

Multiple communities are named after him as well including Hampden County, Massachusetts, Hampden, Massachusetts and Hamden, Connecticut in the United States as well as Hampden, Newfoundland and Labrador in Canada.

See also
Handley Page Hampden - medium bomber named after John Hampden

Notes

References

Sources

 
 
 
 
 
 
 
 
 
 
 
 
 
 
 
 
 
 
 
 
 
 
 
 
 
 
 
 
 
 
 

 
 

1590s births
1643 deaths
People educated at Lord Williams's School
People from Great and Little Hampden
English MPs 1621–1622
English MPs 1624–1625
English MPs 1625
English MPs 1626
English MPs 1628–1629
English MPs 1640 (April)
English MPs 1640–1648
Roundheads
English tax resisters
Five Members
Members of the Parliament of England for Grampound
English military personnel killed in action
People killed in the English Civil War
Parliamentarian military personnel of the English Civil War